Ludwig Ferdinand Wilhelmy (25 December 1812, Stargard in Pommern – 18 February 1864, Berlin) was a German scientist who is usually credited with publishing the first quantitative study in chemical kinetics.

Scientific work 

Wilhelmy studied at Heidelberg, earning a doctorate in 1846.  He worked as a Privatdozent from 1849 to 1854 before moving to Berlin.

Wilhelmy's work in chemical kinetics concerned the acid-catalyzed conversion of a sucrose solution into a 1:1 mixture of fructose and glucose, a reaction that he followed with a polarimeter.  He wrote a differential equation to describe the reaction, integrated it, and used it to interpret his experimental results.  Wilhelmy found that the reaction's rate was proportional to the concentrations of sucrose and of acid present.  He also examined the influence of temperature on the reaction.

According to Moore, Wilhelmy received little credit from his contemporaries for his early investigations in the field of chemical kinetics.  It has been speculated that the strong physical-chemical orientation of Wilhelmy's work, the new method of  polarimetry, and the fact that Wilhelmy was relatively unknown all led to this situation. Similar laboratory results were published by Jacobus Henricus van 't Hoff and Svante Arrhenius 30 years later, with a much greater impact.

Wilhelmy is also known for the Wilhelmy plate method for measuring surface tensions.

See also 

 Chemical kinetics
 Wilhelmy plate

Notes and references

Further reading 

 
 
 
 Excerpts from Wilhelmy's 1850 paper

External links 
 Nobel lecture of Wilhelm Ostwald - describes and pays tribute to Wilhelmy's early work

19th-century German chemists
1812 births
1864 deaths
Heidelberg University alumni
Academic staff of Heidelberg University
People from Stargard